USS Vixen was a brig in commission in the United States Navy in 1813.

Vixen was purchased by the U.S. Navy at Savannah, Georgia in 1813. She was captured at  sea by the Royal Navy frigate HMS Belvidera on 25 December 1813 while sailing from Wilmington, North Carolina, to Newcastle, Delaware without her armament or stores.

References

Brigs of the United States Navy
War of 1812 ships of the United States
1813 ships
Vessels captured from the United States Navy